The Thirty-seventh Amendment of the Constitution is an amendment to the constitution of Ireland which removed the constitution's requirement to criminalise "publication or utterance of blasphemous matter". The amendment was effected by an act of the Oireachtas — the Thirty-seventh Amendment of the Constitution (Repeal of offence of publication or utterance of blasphemous matter) Act 2018, which was introduced (as bill no. 87 of 2018) in Dáil Éireann, passed by the Dáil and Seanad, approved by the people in a referendum, and signed into law by the president.

The bill was introduced to the Oireachtas on 13 July 2018 by the Fine Gael minority coalition government. A referendum was held on 26 October, on the same date as the presidential election. A second referendum on whether to remove an article referring to women's place in the home, originally scheduled for the same date, was postponed until a later date.

The amendment was approved by nearly 65% of the voters, and by a majority in every Dáil constituency. It was signed into law by the president on 27 November 2018. It was followed by separate legislation in 2019 to remove the crime of blasphemy from the statute book.

Background

The publication or utterance of blasphemous matter is an offence specified by the Constitution of Ireland as an exception to general guarantee of the right of the citizens to express freely their convictions and opinions. In Corway v Independent Newspapers (1999), the Supreme Court held that the common law crime of blasphemous libel related to an established church and could not have survived the enactment of the Constitution. They also held that it was impossible to say what the offence of blasphemy consisted of.

The offence of publishing or uttering blasphemous matter was first defined in Irish law in the Defamation Act 2009. Someone is guilty of the offence if they publish or utter "matter that is grossly abusive or insulting in relation to matters held sacred by any religion, thereby causing outrage among a substantial number of the adherents of that religion", and they intend, "by the publication or utterance of the matter concerned, to cause such outrage". There is a broad defence where "a reasonable person would find genuine literary, artistic, political, scientific, or academic value in the matter to which the offence relates". To date, there has not been a public prosecution for the offence of blasphemy in the Irish state.

The Constitutional Convention held a session in November 2013, where they proposed replacing the offence of blasphemy in the Constitution with a prohibition on the incitement of religious hatred.

The matter came to public attention, in May 2017, when it was announced that English comedian Stephen Fry, along with broadcaster RTÉ, were under criminal investigation for blasphemy under the Act, following a complaint from a member of the public about comments made by Fry in a 2015 broadcast interviewed with veteran Irish broadcaster Gay Byrne. The case was dropped after Gardaí confirmed that they had not been able to locate a sufficient number of offended people.

In June 2018, Minister for Justice and Equality Charles Flanagan announced that the government would hold a referendum to simply remove the reference to the offence of blasphemy from the Constitution.

Changes to the text
The Thirty-seventh Amendment amended the final sentence of paragraph i of subsection 1º of Article 40.6 by substituting "seditious"  for "blasphemous, seditious,". The original text read:

The text as amended reads:

Subsequent legislation
The Department of Justice and Equality's draft general scheme for subsequent legislation proposed that the Government introduce a formal Bill to repeal sections 36 and 37 of the Defamation Act 2009, which dealt with the 'Publication or utterance of blasphemous matter' and the 'Seizure of copies of blasphemous statements' respectively, as well as to replace the words "indecent, obscene, or blasphemous" by "indecent or obscene" in the Censorship of Films Act 1923 as amended by the Civil Law (Miscellaneous Provisions) Act 2008, and in the Censorship of Films (Amendment) Act 1925. The Blasphemy (Abolition of Offences and Related Matters) Act 2019, enacted on 17 January 2020, removed these offences from statute law.

Passage through the Oireachtas
The Bill was proposed by Minister Charlie Flanagan and passed all stage in the Dáil on 18 September and all stages of the Seanad on 20 September. Amendments by Solidarity to remove other religious references from the Constitution were ruled out of order. It was opposed in the Seanad by Rónán Mullen.

Campaign
A Referendum Commission to provide information to the public on the proposed amendment was established on 18 July 2018. Minister for Housing, Planning and Local Government Eoghan Murphy signed the electoral order for the referendum on 21 September, setting the polling date as 26 October.

By 17 October, there had been little public debate about the referendum, leading The Irish Times to suggest that this might cause most "Don't know" voters to end up voting "No" as had happened before in similar little-debated referendums, although it still expected the referendum to be carried based on the most recent opinion poll of 12 October.

For
Those who supported removing blasphemy from the constitution included:
 Fine Gael
 Fianna Fáil 
 Sinn Féin 
 Labour Party 
 Green Party
 People Before Profit
 Social Democrats
 Irish Council for Civil Liberties 
 Church of Ireland 
 Atheist Ireland
 Justice Minister Charles Flanagan
 Senator Ivana Bacik
 Michael Nugent of Atheist Ireland

Not opposed
 Irish Catholic Bishops' Conference, who called the provision "obsolete" and said that similar laws have been used to justify violence and oppression against minorities in other parts of the world.

Against
Those who opposed removing blasphemy from the constitution included:
 Islamic Cultural Centre of Ireland
 Senator Rónán Mullen
 Séamas de Barra of Alliance for the Defence of Marriage and the Family
 Colum Kenny of DCU School of Communications

Opinion and exit polling

Voting
The referendum took place on 26 October 2018, on the same day as the presidential election. Polling stations were open from 7 am until 10 pm. Turnout was reported to be low in many areas of the country. By midday, turnout percentages from around the country were in the low teens, with many polling stations reporting single figure percentages. In Dublin some estimates suggested that turnout would be half that of the referendum on the Thirty-sixth Amendment of the Constitution of Ireland in May.

Analysis
The Irish Times's analysis of its exit poll data said that "younger voters overwhelmingly backed deletion, while older voters were much more evenly split, with 48 per cent voting to retain the constitutional article as it currently stands".

RTÉ noted that given that the presidential election had received far more attention, it had been expected that there would be more abstainers than the 1.8% reported in its exit poll data.

When analysing the Red C/RTÉ exit poll, RTÉ Religious and Social Affairs Correspondent Joe Little said that older voters were less likely to vote Yes, with over 8 out of 10 voting Yes among those aged under 44, 7 out of 10 among those aged under 45 to 64, and 6 out of 10 among those aged over 65. Support for No also increased in the lower socio-economic groups, with 77% of those in the top ABC1 group voting Yes, 70% of the C2DE group, and 63% of the bottom F group. Sinn Féin voters were likeliest to vote Yes, followed by those voting Fine Gael, Independent, Labour, and Fianna Fáil. Women and men were equally likely to vote Yes. 80% voted Yes in County Dublin, slightly over 70% in Munster, and slightly under 70% in the rest of Leinster, and in Connacht and the three border counties of Ulster (Donegal, Cavan, and Monaghan). Only 69% said that "they understood the proposition to abolish the offence in the Constitution" (74% of Yes voters, and 64% of No voters).

References

Sources

Citations

External links
 Thirty-seventh Amendment of the Constitution (Repeal of offence of publication or utterance of blasphemous matter) Bill 2018 Oireachtas debates and amendments
 Previous Referendums: Referendum on Blasphemy Referendum Commission

37
37
Ireland, 37
Amendment, 37
37
October 2018 events in Ireland
Religion in the Republic of Ireland
Secularism in Ireland
Blasphemy law in Ireland